The Jeonnam Dragons (Korean: 전남 드래곤즈) are a South Korean professional football club based in the city of Gwangyang, South Jeolla Province that competes in the K League 2, the second tier of South Korean football. The Dragons play their home matches at the Gwangyang Football Stadium, one of the first football-specific stadiums in South Korea. They have won the Korean FA Cup four times (1997, 2006, 2007 and 2021) and were the runners-up of K League in 1997. They also reached the final of the 1998–99 Asian Cup Winners' Cup, where they lost to Al Ittihad.

History
The club was founded on 16 December 1994 as Chunnam Dragons, and appointed former South Korean international Jung Byung-tak as their first manager to oversee their first ever league match which took place on 25 March 1995. Chunnam started life slowly with mid-table finishes during its first few years, but recorded their best ever finish in 1997 when they finished as K League runners-up. In the same year, however, they won their first trophy after winning the 1997 Korean FA Cup, beating Chunan Ilhwa Chunma 1–0 in the final. In 1999, they finished as runners-up of the Asian Cup Winners' Cup after beating J-League giants Kashima Antlers 4–1 in the semi-finals, and losing 3–2 against Al Ittihad of Saudi Arabia in the final.

In 2006 and 2007, Jeonnam won two consecutive Korean FA Cup titles, defeating Suwon Samsung Bluewings and Pohang Steelers respectively in the finals.

On 27 December 2007, Jeonnam appointed Park Hang-seo as its new manager after former manager Huh Jung-moo was appointed to the South Korean national team.

Current squad

Out on loan

Coaching staff

Honours

Domestic

League
 K League 1
Runners-up (1): 1997

Cups
 FA Cup
Winners (4): 1997, 2006, 2007, 2021
Runners-up (1): 2003
 League Cup
Runners-up (3): 1997, 2000s, 2008

International
 Asian Cup Winners' Cup
Runners-up (1): 1999

Season-by-season records

Key
Tms. = Number of teams
Pos. = Position in league

AFC Champions League record

Sponsors

Kit supplier
1995–96: Ludis
1997: Umbro
1998: Adidas
1999: Reebok
2000: Umbro
2001: Adidas
2002–03: Umbro
2004–05: Hummel
2006–09: Astore
2010–11: Jako
2012–15: Kelme
2016-19: Joma
2020–present: Puma

Managers

References

External links

Official website 

 
Association football clubs established in 1994
Sport in South Jeolla Province
K League 1 clubs
K League 2 clubs
POSCO
1994 establishments in South Korea